Synuchus gigas is a species of ground beetle in the subfamily Harpalinae. It was described by Keyimu & Deuve in 1998.

References

Synuchus
Beetles described in 1998